Benjamin Goethe (alternatively spelt Gøthe or Göthe, born 2 April 2003) is a Danish-German racing driver. He is the current champion of the GT World Challenge Europe Endurance Cup in the Silver Cup category.

Early life
Goethe and his younger brother Oliver were educated at Millfield School.

Early career

Karting 
Having been introduced to motorsport at a young age, Goethe started his karting career in 2015. He first raced in various regional and national competitions in France, before competing in a select few international events in 2017, his final year of kart racing.

Formula 4 
Goethe made his single-seater debut in 2018, where he competed in the F4 Spanish Championship for Drivex School. The Dane experienced a challenging campaign, as he finished 13th in the standings with a highest race result of fifth at Jerez.

Sportscar career

2019 – GT debut 
In 2019, Goethe switched to sportscar racing, driving with GPX Racing in four rounds of the Blancpain GT Series Endurance Cup alongside Jordan Grogor and his driver coach in karting and F4, Stuart Hall. The team ended up 20th in the Silver Cup, scoring 16 points, with Goethe becoming that year's recipient of the SRO Merit Award.

The Dane also took part in the 24 Hours of Barcelona as part of the 24H GT Series, where he took his first podium in car racing, finishing third.

2020 – Move to WRT 
He returned to the newly rebranded GT World Challenge Europe Endurance Cup the following year, this time driving for ROFGO Racing with Team WRT, having become a member of the Bullet Sports Management roster. The campaign started out in disappointing fashion, as an eighth place in class at Imola was followed up by a retirement at the Hockenheimring. At the third round, the 24 Hours of Spa, which Goethe contested as the youngest of 179 entrants, the Dane made an error in the closing stages, as he spun off in wet conditions, which forced his car to retire. The conclusion to his season proved to be more positive, as Goethe, along with teammates Stuart Hall and Rik Breukers, finished the race in fourth place in the Silver Cup, which elevated the squad to twelfth in the standings.

2021 – Double campaign 
For the 2021 season, Goethe remained with the team, but this time competed in both the Endurance Cup and the GT World Challenge Europe Sprint Cup.

He would be paired up alongside James Pull and Stuart Hall for the former championship. Their season started out strongly at the opening round in Monza, where Goethe and his teammates finshed sixth in the overall results, whilst taking a podium for the Silver Cup. Despite this ending up as the only podium of their campaign, the team took fifth in the Silver Cup, with an impressive charge up the field at the Barcelona season finale being a particular highlight of Goethe's season.

In the latter series, Goethe experienced a mixed campaign, scoring only two points finishes but taking one podium in Race 2 at Misano, which put the Dane 21st overall. He summed up his season as having been "challenging", but also described it as a positive learning experience.

2022 – Silver Cup title 
Goethe started his 2022 season by finishing second in the Dubai 24 Hour race, before announcing that he would stay on in both the Endurance and Sprint Cup with ROFGO Racing with Team WRT, driving with Thomas Neubauer in the Sprint series, with the pair being partnered by Jean-Baptiste Simmenauer in the former championship.

The Sprint Cup series campaign began in torrid fashion, as a first-corner retirement caused by a rival car in the first race at Brands Hatch was followed by a meager 16th place in Race 2. A pair of points finishes in class at Magny-Cours came next, before Goethe and Neubauer scored a pair of podiums for the Silver Cup, as well as their first points for the main standings, during the next event in Zandvoort. The penultimate round, held at Misano, brought significant successes to the pairing, which finished third overall in Race 1, with Goethe holding off Audi factory driver Christopher Haase in the dying embers of the contest, after which they took another class podium on Sunday. Their campaign ended with a fourth place and class podium at Valencia, which meant that Goethe and Neubauer finished third in the Silver Cup and eleventh in the overall drivers' standings.

The Danish-German's season in the Endurance Cup would prove to bring even more success, starting out with a class win at Imola, where Goethe took his first ever victory in car racing, which he called "the perfect way to start". This was followed by a pole position in the Silver category at Le Castellet, but a spin from Goethe put the win out of reach for his team, which eventually finished fourth in class. What came next were the 24 Hours of Spa, where, having avoided any mistakes, Goethe, Simmenauer and Neubauer won in the Silver Cup, putting the outfit into the lead of the championship. At the Hockenheimring, the Dane and his teammates finished third in their class, enough to clinch the Silver Cup title with one remaining round. The team finished the season in style by winning in their category at Barcelona, leaving them with 125 points, 49 ahead of second place.

With those results, Goethe, along with Neubauer, was crowned as the overall GT World Challenge Europe Silver Cup champion.

2023 
At the beginning of 2023, Goethe returned to take part in the Dubai 24 Hours, this time partnering brother Oliver, father Roald, Stuart Hall and Jordan Grogor in the GT4 category, with the team ending up as the winners within said class. During the same winter, the Dane teamed up with Marvin Kirchhöfer and Alexander West at Garage 59 for the GT class of the Asian Le Mans Series. Goethe continued his relationship with Garage 59 for the remainder of the season, embarking on a full-season GT World Challenge Europe campaign in the Pro class. In the Sprint Cup, Goethe formed a pairing with Nicolai Kjærgaard, while Kirchhöfer completed the Endurance Cup trio.

Personal life 
Goethe is part of a racing family, with his father Roald having been a competitor in the FIA World Endurance Championship, and his younger brother Oliver Goethe currently racing in the FIA Formula 3 Championship. He is also a descendant of famous German writer Johann Wolfgang von Goethe.

Racing record

Racing career summary 

† As Goethe was a guest driver, he was ineligible to score points.
* Season still in progress.

Complete F4 Spanish Championship results 
(key) (Races in bold indicate pole position) (Races in italics indicate fastest lap)

Complete GT World Challenge results

GT World Challenge Europe Endurance Cup 
(Races in bold indicate pole position) (Races in italics indicate fastest lap)

*Season still in progress.

GT World Challenge Europe Sprint Cup 
(key) (Races in bold indicate pole position) (Races in italics indicate fastest lap)

Complete 24 Hours of Spa results

Complete Intercontinental GT Challenge results

Complete Dubai 24 Hour results

Complete Asian Le Mans Series results 
(key) (Races in bold indicate pole position) (Races in italics indicate fastest lap)

References

External links 
 

2003 births
Living people
Danish racing drivers
German racing drivers
Danish people of German descent
German people of Danish descent
Spanish F4 Championship drivers
24H Series drivers
Drivex drivers
Blancpain Endurance Series drivers
ADAC GT Masters drivers
W Racing Team drivers
Le Mans Cup drivers
Asian Le Mans Series drivers
People educated at Millfield